Kyril Petrov Vassilev (Bulgarian: Кирил Петров Василев; May 24, 1908 in Bulgaria – June 23, 1987 in the United States)  was a world-renowned portrait painter of royalty and American society during the mid-20th century.   His parents were Bulgarian and stated that he started painting when he was 3 years old.

At the age of 16, Vassilev received his first important portrait commission to paint Bulgaria's Secretary of War, General Lazaroff.  He then enrolled in the Bulgarian Academy of Sciences.  In 1927, he was selected to paint the official portrait of Bulgaria's King Boris.

In 1929, he completed his masterpiece portrait of the Archbishop Angelo Roncalli, then the papal nuncio to Bulgaria. The Archbishop later became Pope John XXIII.  This is the only portrait of Pope John XXIII in his bishop's robe.  Vassilev kept the portrait and later rejected an offer of $250,000 for the life-sized oil painting.

Vassilev continued to establish himself as a world-famous portrait artist.  He moved to the United States in 1937. He also established a studio in West Palm Beach, where he continued to paint political officials and socialites such as Helen Rich.  His friendships included Ernest Hemingway, President Harry S. Truman and Jack Dempsey.

In 1948, Vassilev painted a portrait of American president, Harry S. Truman, which hangs in the Truman Presidential Museum & Library.  
Vassilev's famous clients included King Peter II of Yugoslavia and King Michael of Romania.

In 1989, Norton Gallery of Art in West Palm Beach, Florida, held a retrospective of his work.

Vassilev died on June 23, 1987, of a heart attack.

References

External links
New York Times obituary

1908 births
1987 deaths
American people of Bulgarian descent
Bulgarian artists
American portrait painters
Bulgarian people